Elizabeth Henry Campbell Russell (1749–1825), a sister of Patrick Henry and Annie Henry Christian, was born in Hanover County, Virginia, to John Henry and Sarah Winston. In 1776 she married Gen. William Campbell (1745–1781), the commander of the American forces that defeated the British at the Battle of King's Mountain in 1780; this was the turning point of the American Revolution.

Following Campbell's death in 1781, she married Gen. William Russell in 1783. They lived at Aspenvale, near Seven Mile Ford, Virginia until 1788 when they moved to Saltville where they carried on the manufacture of salt. The Russells converted to Methodism in 1788. After Gen. Russell's death in 1793, Elizabeth spent the remainder of her life fostering Methodism in southwestern Virginia and northeastern Tennessee. Francis Asbury and various Circuit Riders stopped regularly at her home. She is credited with bringing Methodism to western Virginia and northeastern Tennessee. In 1812 she moved to Chilhowie, Virginia to be nearer the Great Road. She died in March 1825 and is buried in the Aspenvale Cemetery in Seven Mile Ford, Virginia.  The Elizabeth Cemetery in Saltville, Virginia is named after her.

References

 William Russell and his Descendants by Anna Russell des Cognets, Lexington, KY, 1884.
 William Russell: a Revolutionary patriot of the Clinch Valley by Mary Katherine Thorp, Master's Thesis, University of Virginia, 1936.
 Madam Russell Methodist Church, https://www.flickr.com/photos/bluebird218/3085974050/.
 Madam Russell by Gladys Stallard
 Saltville by Jeffrey C. Weaver
 "Elizabeth Henry Campbell Russell: Champion of Faith in the Early Republic" by John Kukla, Virginia Women: Their Lives and Times--Volume 1
 Taking Heaven by Storm: Methodism and the Rise of Popular Christianity in America by John H. Wigger

External links
 

1749 births
1825 deaths
Methodists from Virginia
People from Hanover County, Virginia
Virginia colonial people
People from Smyth County, Virginia
People from Saltville, Virginia
People from Chilhowie, Virginia